Chateau Royale (formerly known as the Undermount Offices at Alexandra Square) is a mixed-use residential condominium and commercial complex located at 135 James Street South, in the downtown core of Hamilton, Ontario, Canada.  The building is located in the centre of the city, bound by James Street to the west, and the Hamilton GO Centre to the north.

The former office complex opened in 1966, and the newly formed residential tower officially opened in 2006.

Early history
The plot where the hotel now stands has a history dating back to the late 19th century. Despite the opening of St. Joseph's Hospital four blocks south
in 1890 and the construction of the Toronto, Hamilton, and Buffalo (TH&B) Railway Station adjacent to the plot in 1894, the property remained decidedly working-class. There was only a lumber yard, a painter, and a plumber's office amongst empty storefronts and a few workers' cottages.

On December 25, 1906, the lumber yard at the southern end of the block was replaced by a sprawling roller rink, that became one of the city's only venues for live music, dancing, and alcohol. The opening of the Alexandra Roller Skating Rink, accelerated the block's growth into an active working-class commercial center, boasting a Chinese laundry, the Dominion Express Company, a tailor, and a cobbler's shop by 1911.

Wedged between the wealthy and predominately residential neighbourhood of Durand and the working-class borough of Corktown, James Street South underwent significant social and economic changes during the interwar period.

The introduction of the automobile and the rapid outward growth of Hamilton shifted economic power in the city. Upper- and middle-class families moved to sprawling new lots and brick mansions in the east end of the city around the newly formed Beaux-Arts-inspired Gage Park and suburban plots around Kenilworth and Parkdale Avenue, both of which were previously upper-class summer cottage areas. Robert Fogelson, American urban historian and professor at the Massachusetts Institute of Technology, in his book; Downtown: Its Rise and Fall, 1880–1950, chronicles the long battle between downtown business interests and the growing city periphery to maintain a thriving metropolitan core.

Despite its compact size, the downtown core contained virtually all the city's significant financial, governmental, and retail institutions, along with its corporate offices, much of the city's light and wholesale industries, and public amusements.

Although concentration was regarded as a significant social and economic convenience for businesses, as proximity to the city's main arterial roads and public transportation hubs facilitated the tides of workers and consumers that flooded the area daily, the downtown streets quickly and inevitably became extremely congested. Folgelson begins by stating that while the sidewalks were always "jammed to suffocation with pedestrians" due to the close location of stores, offices, theatre, and bars, the introduction of the vehicle only worsened the situation by further pushing pedestrians onto the sidewalks and clogging the roads with traffic that ultimately slowed down the streetcar, reducing its reliability.

Such congestion allowed urban North Americans to witness an increasing distinction between the busy core and the quiet city periphery. If they could afford it, they chose to live at the growing city's edge. Understanding the market preference for peripheral living and often opting to live in distant residential communities themselves, business owners advocated for rapid transit systems and glittering new office buildings to ensure that the dispersing population continued to venture and collectivise their financial interests downtown.

Conflicts between the center and the periphery grew more intense as the 20th century carried on. The downtown central business district, as it was frequently labeled in the early 20th century, faced greater rivalry from satellite business districts in residential areas, ultimately causing downtown institutions to spread further outward and weakening the area's overall power and pedestrian convenience. As a result, attention turned to James Street South.

Anchored by St. Joseph's Hospital at the base of Escarpment and one of the only roads connecting the expanding residential neighbourhoods on the cliff's plateau with the downtown core, the arterial thoroughfare represented prime real estate for a reluctantly transforming core. Close enough to old-world industrialist influence, the downtown core, expanding suburban communities, a passenger rail line, and the lucrative medical industry by the time of the Great Depression, the area had morphed into an active professional community that included
commerce, retail, entertainment, and upscale Bay-and-Gable townhomes.

The growth in commercial activity can be seen in various examples within the built environment. For example, the Hamilton Medical Arts building, a monumental seven-story Art Deco office tower, opened a block south of the Alexandra Roller Skating Rink in 1930. On October 20, 1930, after two decades of debates between TH&B and the city of Hamilton, an agreement was finally reached and a contract signed, resulting in the closure of several streets and the construction of elevated track work for the rail line.

The original design of the new TH&B passenger station proposed a ten-story office tower with multiple wings for passenger facilities and two platforms for incoming and outgoing train traffic. However, the plans were reduced under the pressure of the Great Depression, with only several stories of office space and a singular passenger platform ultimately built.

Construction of the new art deco inspired station and track line began in December 1932 and was completed almost eight months later, on June 26, 1933. Across the street, The Hamilton Conservatory of Music underwent a major overhaul, becoming the center of musical higher education in the city during this period, permitting the granting of degrees first by the University of Toronto and later by the University of Trinity College.

Despite the exorbitant amount of growth occurring around the parcel of land directly south of the TH&B station, the plot remained relatively unchanged. However, towards the end of the Great Depression, as passenger rail improved and grew to nearly 30 trains per day the Alexandra became so wildly famous that by the Second World War, even though the roller rink occupied only a third of the block, the entire parcel was unofficially dubbed "Alexandra Square."

During the war, passenger levels almost doubled at the TH&B station as rationing forced people to use the rails for travel. Not only that, but troop trains ran through the station at all hours to carry soldiers to training camps in Niagara-on-the-Lake and airbases in Dunnville. Troops leaving for the war flocked to the Alexandra roller rink to have some fun and engage in a little romance before heading out to battle. Combined with musicians from the conservatory across the street looking to practice their craft, medical staff, and students from the hospital down the road, and commuters waiting to catch a train it, all converged to turn the area into one giant raging wartime party.

Urban hangover
By the end of the Second World War, after fifteen years of urban negligence under the Great Depression and the nation's participation in a total war strategy, the city placed a new focus on reviving its stagnating downtown core. The newly amended National Housing Act (1954) stipulated provisions for cost-sharing measures to be taken by the federal and municipal government in cooperation with the Central Mortgage and Housing Corporation (CMHC) to prepare urban renewal studies. Further legislation and amendments also allowed for provisions in regards to implementing public service upgrades in accordance with such studies. Modernism was also sweeping through the world, and it began to influence the architectural and planning sphere. Local politicians absorbed plans by renowned French architect and urbanist Le Corbusier, who's theories and prototypes stressed that modern architecture and efficient zones of productivity could uplift the standard of life of the urban poor and increase economic output. This ideology suited Hamilton almost entirely, with a large working class populous and the centre of its economy placed in the manufacturing sector, the city's planners were enthusiastic at the idea of dividing up the municipality into different zones that served specific functions, connected by efficient transportation arteries that could move people and goods quickly. The dream of a futuristic, straight-edged, and fast-moving city soon favoured citizens, business owners, and politicians alike who started to look at the many Victorian streetscapes around them as antiquated, dirty, and unfit for a new vehicular world.

In 1957, the Hamilton Downtown Association embarked on an extensive and detailed urban renewal study. Upon looking at the plans, when they were completed a year later the federal planner, Mark David, could not recommend the allocation of funds for a renewed business district in the downtown core. While the National Housing Act allotted for funds to be given to municipalities to revitalize their downtown cores, it was only meant to clear and rebuild urban housing slums. Funds were, however, granted to Hamilton for the clearance of working class housing in the city's North End, and for the removal of derelict cottages on the beach of Lake Ontario. While the city's politicians were initially daunted by the idea of not having a funding source for their grand rejuvenation of commerce and entertainment in the district, wider national political trends were about the present the city with its wish.

Absorbing the Quiet Revolution
For centuries, Montreal served as the centre of commerce in Canada. Goods that flowed in and out of the nation at some point transversed through the ports of the city. Conveniently located in the middle of the St. Lawrence River, it had always been used as a trading post before the arrival of Europeans and long afterwards. However, by the beginning of the 1960s, multiple economic and cultural shifts began to converge and it left the city in despair.

Between 1930 and 1960 Toronto slowly began to replace Montreal as the financial capital of Canada. As the United States' industrial output eclipsed that of Britain; it began to take the place of Canada's chief economic partner. Toronto, and indeed most of Southern Ontario, benefitted immensely from this new found partnership. American corporations opened up a litany of branch plants in Ontario and created with it a myriad of white collar jobs to fill newly created regional headquarters. American industrial companies also favoured Toronto over Montreal for its Anglophone roots. Business could be conducted easier in a predominately English speaking province; moreover, Toronto was simply closer to other Rust Belt Cities and could easily connect with expanding industrial centres in the Midwest. And finally, the opening of the St. Lawrence Seaway in 1959 only added to this economic flight, as ocean-going vessels now had the ability to bypass the port of Montreal, thus reducing its image and status as the centre of Canada's transportation hub.

By 1961, there were as many corporate head offices in Toronto as there in Montreal and the transfers of corporate commercial offices were by no means over at that point. The overall decline of Montreal as a national economic centre would serve as the petri dish for Francophone efforts to establish supremacy over traditionally Anglophone structures and institutions. The decline in corporate investment created an economic shift in the city from a global focus to a regional/provincial power and paved the way for the Quiet Revolution, and later the radicalism that followed. Such political strife ultimately resulted in more corporate investment lost.

The shift in financial power occurring in Canada during this period was not entirely restricted to Toronto. In fact, Hamilton also absorbed a significant amount of manufacturing and white-collar corporate investment. As an already established industrial centre and port town, long before Toronto, Hamilton took on dozens of branch plants and head offices as well. City council was also very quick to approve zoning variances on highrise apartment buildings, which soon saw the southwest corridor of the city covered in multi-unit dwellings.

Despite not having the funds for a large commercial core renewal project, the city was still transforming into the Modernist paradise it dreamed up for itself years before. Realizing that city by-law prohibited the construction of commercial and residential buildings in the neighbourhoods of Durand and Corktown above seven stories, including the basement, early in 1964 city council removed the regulation, so construction of high-rises could occur with much less bureaucratic interference. And it worked, on April 30 of the same year, the Alexandra Roller Skating Rink closed.

The Victorian Revivalist building long in decline after its heyday during the Second World War had come to represent an old symbol of the city's cluttered past, and it was soon demolished to make way for the Undermount Office Complex at Alexandra Square.

Tiny room, big party
In the Spring of 1966, almost two years after the Alexandra closed, the Undermount Office Complex opened to surprisingly little fanfare. The complex consisted of two blue-black glass fronted buildings on top of a partially sunken, white brick parking podium that boasted a rooftop plaza leading to the entrances. It was something that Hamiltonian's had never seen before. But while the glittering glass buildings were an entirely new architectural style to Hamilton, much publication now centered on council debates regarding the design plans for Hamilton Civic Square (now Lloyd D. Jackson Square). Compounded by the fact that the rate of high-rise construction in the southwest corridor was comparable to contemporary condo construction in Toronto, it makes sense that a progress-obsessed city wouldn't worship new commercial development regardless of how much it was previously wanted.

Despite the weak public response though, the complex soon resumed the role of community life that the Alexandra had before its closure. 
Rose Symak, a petite woman standing no more than five feet, began waitressing at the age of sixteen. When she moved to the east end of Hamilton with her husband in 1955, she continued to work part-time to supplement her family's income. At the age of 44, she applied to work at the new Undermount Bar & Grill, which she initially thought would be a quiet establishment filled with meandering office workers, and the occasional nurse looking to drink somberly in the one room restaurant. With 28 years of experience she immediately got the job, and what once was a one room restaurant soon grew five-fold into a highly successful, bar and grill establishment that served the entire community from office workers to blue collar industrialists, and medical staff alike. At her surprise retirement party, she reflected on her career and stated the following; "When I first started, the restaurant was one tiny little room, but it's gotten bigger and bigger…" In her 29 years of service, the restaurant had gone through four different managers and several expansions that towards the end of the commercial complex's life, took up almost the entire first floor of the ten-storey tower and a third of the rooftop plaza.

When Rose started in 1966, the Undermount Bar & Grill was something of a watering hole for university students. McMaster University's partnership with St. Joseph's Hospital brought a plethora of young students to the area, and they took advantage of one of the city's only downtown patio bars at the time. Nino DiFilippo, the owner and operator of the restaurant in 2001 described the progression of the clientele and community as follows, "A lot of people from the hospitals, like nurses, went there. And I guess a lot of guys went [there] to meet nurses." With office professionals right above the restaurant, and a healthy stream of young hospital staff the restaurant became so profitable and popular it had to expand multiple times. A loyal customer for over three decades, Jon Buttrum remembered it being a place of constant excitement and energy. "Both buildings were full in those days, and lunches at the Undermount were packed. Fifteen or twenty years ago, if you got there on a Friday after four o'clock in the afternoon, you wouldn't get a seat all night." Like most parties, however, they eventually come to an end, and like the Alexandra before it, the Undermount Bar & Grill was no different.

Troublesome transit
In the post-war era, Hamilton and Toronto, like most other North American cities, entered a period of urban sprawl, which was fed by the construction of large inter-urban highway systems.

Funded and controlled by the provincial government, municipal citizens often had very little input or consultation in the matter, and a few homes as well as business were usually destroyed in the construction. The first highway systems centered along the peripheral of the city and commuters could only approach what was then the outskirts of town, thus making daily trips to the commercial center and industrial lands time-consuming and as an increasing amount of the population flocked to the suburbs an efficient transportation system to service the booming
residential areas became a pressing issue. To achieve such a goal Hamilton focused on removing its trolley car system and transforming its downtown street grid into a one-way network, while the city of Toronto formed a new regional government that incorporated its early suburbs with priorities set on expanding its highways into the downtown core and did so with the construction of the Gardiner Expressway and Don Valley Parkway.

Initially there existed very little controversy to the newly implemented urban policies but by the late 1960s the mood of citizens had changed drastically. As highway routes were extended and urban streets converted into high-occupancy arterials the number of houses and business that required removal jumped dramatically. Additionally, with the arrival of Jane Jacobs in Canada there became an increasing understanding that more cars downtown fueled gridlock, polluted the air, and led to the fleeing of capital out of city cores, which directly correlated with growing urban decay. The Spadina Expressway then became the focal point of citizen concern as the public debate surrounding transit raged in the counterculture era.

If mass transit networks were to replace the highway schemes the system would have to provide the convenience of car travel. Although public transit vehicles had the ability to travel faster than cars they required clear and separated right of ways that eliminated slowdowns due to traffic congestion or non-scheduled stops. Subways are a prime example of a separated mass transit system that outperforms cars, however they are extremely expensive to build and require high ridership levels to justify both the capital and operative costs; a density of people that the suburbs simply could not provide. Although, buses could serve the sprawling residential areas they are often subject to volatile traffic situations and stop frequently.

What had to be provided was an entirely new system that could operate at the speeds of a subway system but at much lower costs. Since most a subway's expense comes with digging underground, the routes would have to be aboveground and preferably elevated as to not ruin the idyllic nature of the suburbs they would serve. To also save on costs and not overtly alter the suburban landscape the tracks, vehicles, and stations would have to smaller than a typical subway and automated if possible.

The new system would aim at obtaining ridership levels above that of a bus system but below the high capacity of a subway somewhere between 4,000 and 20,000 people per hour per direction (PPHPD), the result would be called an Intermediate Capacity Transit System, popularly dubbed; "ICTS". The ICTS technology would be used in a new network of three major lines in Toronto, one in Hamilton, and one in Ottawa to combat the growing amount of traffic congestion, the faltering of private passenger rail, and the scaling back of both bus and streetcar route development in a plan that would become known as "GO-Urban". Although the province was not willing to take over the Maglev system they were still willing to continue with the development of some sort of ICTS concept.

Purchasing several patents from the United States that focused on replacing the magnet, or rubber wheel concept and setting up a testing track just outside of Kingston, the provincial government created a scaled-down prototype that closely resembled an elevated subway system; a notion, which will play a large factor in its public disfavor. With the test system in Kingston nearing completion and showing signs of success a provincial sales effort ensued.

The government set its sights now on Scarborough and Hamilton, the latter being the preferred site since the Toronto Transit Commission was putting up both a public and legal battle. On December 15, 1981, after two years of intense debate and grass-roots activism, the Hamilton-Wentworth Regional Council rejected the proposal to build the $111-million elevated rapid train line from Jackson Square downtown to Lime Ridge Mall in what was then the center of the city's booming escarpment suburbs.

Much of the citizen groups and council's opposition to the ICTS system stemmed from the details of the proposal. Presented with three options for the instalment of the system, two of which would have been strictly within the lower city, a misinformed and pressured city council chose the seemingly least impactful Jackson Square to Lime Ridge Mall route. However, to climb up the escarpment the tracks would have had to run along a 5.5-meter-high platform through John and James Streets disrupting the wealthy historic residential district and commercial strip that lines the bottom of the escarpment which would also require tunneling to make the system reach Fennell Avenue at the top. 
 

Making matters worse TH&B Railway refused to lend its rail yard and station services the ICTS system. Thus, requiring it to loop around next to and through Alexandra Square potentially disrupting the rooftop patio operations of the restaurant and bringing amplified noise and vibration to the property since it was next to crucial sharp curves – angering staff, patrons tenants, and the property managers alike. The elevated stations also brought fear into downtown citizens and business owners who worried that the distance from street-level view would make the shelters havens for crime and delinquency, which was feared, could reach the idyllic escarpment neighbourhoods quicker than ever before. The rhetoric surrounding the system's naysayers painted the lower city as undeserving – littered with crime, and devoid of economic stamina for a new transit system. While property owners in the lower city were infuriated that the province and the municipality could consider a transportation system that brushes against and hovers over private property. Yet by not making considerable investments in transit the city flatlined ridership levels and hurt its ability to attract further economic development by not offering much to service industry clients.

The clock runs out
Starting in 1990, the nurses at St. Joseph's Hospital were phased into twelve-hour shifts, and while a three-hour increase in work hours doesn't seem like a significant hurdle to the restaurant industry nearby, it had a major effect on the Undermount. DiFilippo in his 2001 reflection describes it as absolutely devastating. "We had nurses coming in at eleven o'clock after a three-to-eleven shift. But when they brought in twelve-hour shifts the nurses stopped coming." And in the same year when the conservative government introduced the federal GST, business at the Undermount was further pressed. "People didn't like to see that seventeen percent tacked on [the liquor tab] at the end of the night." Then the infamous recession of the early 1990s struck and DiFilippo was barely able to hold on to his business as thousands of Hamilton steelworkers and manufacturers began losing their jobs. And finally, on September 3, 1993, Rose Symak retired from the Undermount Bar & Grill at the age of seventy-three. With an elderly husband ill at home, she had decided it was time to leave. And as long-time patron, Jon Buttrum described it, "It will certainly be different for me coming in here with her gone," and it most certainly was.

Going down in flames
By 1995 the state of Hamilton's economy was in bad shape. The recession that struck North America had taken a toll on the city's predominately industrial economy. Long in decline, the manufacturing sector could no longer sustain itself under the weight of international competition, rising production costs, and consistent periods of boom and bust in the stock market. Thousands of jobs were cut, and a loss of tax revenue from corporations and civilians alike resulted in the lack of funds to invest in the downtown core.

Other modernist commercial complexes in the city, such as Jackson Square, once the bastion of retail and office productivity in the city, suffered greatly during this period as well. In fact, ever since the opening of Limeridge Mall on the escarpment in 1981, commerce had slowly been leaving the downtown business area. Combined with the volatile state of retail in the 1980s, that saw the entrance of fast-fashion into the North American market, the consolidation of regional brands, and the retraction of department stores the area surrounding the Undermount complex was no longer attractive and vibrant. Slowly, but surely, white collar jobs left Hamilton as well.

In 1996, Stelco Tower had a workforce of 303 people and a vacancy rate of 69%, down from zero percent vacancy and a workforce of 1,697 employees just sixteen years prior in 1979. The Undermount complex at Alexandra Square was no different, and by the end of the twentieth century had only a few floors occupied mostly by government offices. However, the vastly underutilized space attracted delinquency and a string of arson attacks that left the office towers very existence in question.

Around 8:00 p.m. on Tuesday, January 24, 1995, a fire broke out in the elevator shaft of the smaller ten-story office tower at Alexandra Square. Smelling smoke, the patrons of the Undermount Bar & Grill called the police who quickly arrived and cleared everyone out of the building. While the fire was small and mostly confined to the elevator car where the firefighters suspected attempted arson, it caused over $60,000 in damage and resulted in the entire car
having to be replaced, and the upper floors cleaned and painted over due to smoke damage. Already close to zero percent occupancy and vastly under maintained, the repairs had to be paid for by the property owners, much to their reluctance and frustration.

A year later, on July 31, 1996, another fire broke out in the Undermount complex. After a power failure had blacked out much of the downtown core, firefighters received a call saying that there was a fire in the larger fifteen-story office building. By the time, they arrived only smoke was visible in the building, but the elevators had automatically shut down leaving a wheelchair-using insurance agent, David Binns, trapped on the eighth floor and an elderly woman with severe multiple sclerosis on the twelfth floor. Both of which had to be carried out in specialized ambulance chairs supplied by Fleetwood Ambulance in a much publicized and dramatized fashion. The ultimate cause of the fire was found to be lit paper torches in the hallway. Rose Madaffari, a telemarketer on the eighth floor of the building admitted to being in the stairwell before the power went out and lighting paper to find her way out.

Investigators with the Hamilton Fire Department would ultimately come to accept her version of events, but they scrutinized Alexandra Square's owner and operator to figure out why the backup generator did not automatically supply the complex with power but suffered from a forty-minute delay that led to a tense high-rise rescue. No answer was ever provided to the public, but the buildings increasingly began to be viewed as antiquated and unsafe for habitation.

This general uneasiness surrounding the complex only continued until a third suspicious fire on March 14, 1998, that started in a closet of one of the offices led to another evacuation of the buildings. Frustrated, the owner began the process of selling the parcel of land.

A condo core
On January 1, 2001, the Regional Municipality of Hamilton-Wentworth underwent the process of amalgamation into a one-tier political system, thus creating the new City of Hamilton. The new city now comprised the former municipalities of Hamilton, Dundas, Ancaster, Flamborough, Glanbrook, and Stoney Creek, and while the new regional municipality, as a whole, was doing quite well economically speaking, it faced the burdensome reality of a dying core. A study conducted by the Hamilton Spectator in December 2000, highlighted that less than 3% of the total building permit values were located in the downtown commercial core.

The diaspora of head offices to newer buildings and facilities in nearby areas such as Ancaster and Burlington as well as the centralization of operations in Toronto led to chronically high office vacancies in the core. Compounded by high property taxes, with Hamilton's commercial office rate in the year 2000 being 7.5% in comparison to Burlington's 3.5%, it almost made economic sense to leave downtown Hamilton. With no new office construction since Commerce Place II on 21 King Street West in 1990, much of the commercial stock that the city had to offer fell into Class C value, which meant that they were almost functionally obsolete especially in a new internet age. Facing the pointless demolition of many structurally sound and architecturally significant buildings, the city desperately looked at options for its empty office structures.

Many developers seeing an opportunity to grab large parcels of once valuable land approached the city with proposals to turn office buildings into residential units, which was one of the only stable markets in the core area anyway. The City council quickly reacted and created a ten-million-dollar loan fund which by the spring of 2001 had already been completely tapped out.

One of those developers that approached the city was Bear Incorporated from Kitchener, Ontario. Long in discussion with the owners of Alexandra Square, they finally signed off on a sale on November 23, 2000. They planned to connect the two buildings and create 170 apartments. There was a bit of speculation between the city and the developer as to whether or not the newly converted units would be sold as condominiums to repay the city the money loaned to them, and this created a bureaucratic bone of contention that delayed construction for almost four years. But when the building finally opened again in 2006 it received the fanfare it never did in 1966.

On January 5, 2008, the Toronto Star ran an article that discusses the exodus of priced-out Torontonians, and in it, interviewee Kevin Bowers uses the Chateau Royale and a microcosm for positive urban growth in the city of Hamilton. "I think the fact that Chateau Royale (a large condo project) did get finished, and that the Core Lofts (a condo conversion of a Bell Canada building) sold out so quickly proves something. People see success." But while the condo was patronizingly lauded in Toronto as being a symbol of Hamilton's turnaround, local inhabitants saw it differently. The modernist glass towers were covered in bright yellow, beige, and orange stucco. Marble pillars and post-modernist vases in off-purple were added to embellish the square corners of the tower in an attempt to make it look like a French palace, when in fact it was nothing of the sort.

Skyscraper Forum, a global blogging forum website where city dwellers post their thoughts amongst construction updates and policy debates surrounding new builds in different cities, strikingly opposed the newly transformed Alexandra Square.

However, The biggest impact that the Chateau Royale had was the economic revival it helped to foster in a previously rundown rust belt city. Tapping into demand from commuters and workers in nearby St. Joseph's hospital, developers converted the tower into a residential project that proved to be at least in part, successful and laid the foundation for future visions and zoning around Hamilton's new West Harbour GO Station.

Building amenities and retailers

The Chateau Royale offers leisure facilities including a party room with pool table, a rooftop sun-deck with panoramic views, 20,000 sq. ft. of beautifully landscaped lawns on the roof of the parking garage, and an outdoor BBQ patio.

Chateau Royale also offers a wide range of modern fitness equipment, free weights, universal gym, elliptical trainers and a personal trainer on request.

Currently, the Chateau Royale commercial spaces are host to a denture clinic and a dental hygiene office.

Further reading

References

Buildings and structures in Hamilton, Ontario